The Mitsubishi Dion is a compact MPV produced by Japanese automaker Mitsubishi Motors. Following its exhibition at the 1999 Tokyo Motor Show, it was introduced on January 25, 2000 priced from ¥1,598,000–1,848,000, it was built on a stretched Lancer/Mirage platform, with seven seats in a 2–3–2 configuration. The name was derived from Dionysus, the Greek god of wine and joy.

A facelifted Dion was launched in Japan in May 2002.

Annual production and sales
The company's initial sales target for the car was 4,500 in the first month, a figure exceeded by 1,000 after the first two weeks.

(Sources: Facts & Figures 2000, Facts & Figures 2005, Facts & Figures 2007, Mitsubishi Motors website)

References

External links
Cherry Hill Mitsubishi

Dion
All-wheel-drive vehicles
Front-wheel-drive vehicles
Compact MPVs
Cars introduced in 2000
Cars discontinued in 2005